Calgary Signal Hill is a federal electoral district in Alberta, Canada, that has been represented in the House of Commons of Canada since 2015.

Calgary Signal Hill was created by the 2012 federal electoral boundaries redistribution and was legally defined in the 2013 representation order. It came into effect after the 2015 federal election was called. It was created out of parts of the electoral districts of Calgary West and Calgary Centre.

Geography

The Calgary Signal Hill riding extends from the Bow River south to Glenmore Trail SW and from 101 St SW east to 37 St SW. It contains the neighbourhoods of Aspen Woods, Bowness, Christie Park, Coach Hill, Cougar Ridge, Crestmont, Discovery Ridge, Glamorgan, Glenbrook, Glendale, Patterson, Rosscarrock, Signal Hill, Springbank Hill, Spruce Cliff, Strathcona Park, The Slopes, Valley Ridge, Wentworth, Westgate, West Springs and Wildwood.

Members of Parliament

This riding has elected the following members of the House of Commons of Canada:

Election results

References

Alberta federal electoral districts
Politics of Calgary